Karin Jaani (27 August 1952, Ahja – 7 October 2009) was an Estonian diplomat and politician. She was a member of VIII Riigikogu.

From 2001 until 2005, she was the Ambassador of Estonia to Russian Federation.

References

1952 births
2009 deaths
Estonian women diplomats
Members of the Riigikogu, 1992–1995
Members of the Riigikogu, 1995–1999
Women members of the Riigikogu
Ambassadors of Estonia to Russia
University of Tartu alumni
People from Põlva Parish